Zhybirsk is a settlement in Abay District, Karaganda Region, Kazakhstan.

Populated places in Karaganda Region